Raytown South Senior High School is a high school located in Raytown, Missouri.  The school was established in 1961, and graduated its first class of seniors in 1964. As Raytown became less of a "destination-suburb" in the 1990s, the enrollment fell drastically.

Academics

Debate
The forensics program has had several national champions in various styles of debate, public forum, expository speaking and poetry reading.

Choir
From 1984-2009, the choir program saw several dozen student attain All-State status. The choir program performed throughout Kansas City, including Crown Center, Arrowhead Stadium and Royals Stadium. Every May, thousands came to an annual variety show called Southern Comfort. In November 2005, sang at Carnegie Hall along with several other show choirs from across the country.

Athletics

Boys basketball
From the inception of the school until March 2006, the program was under the direction of the legendary Bud Lathrop.  His career record was 955-300, going 924-267 at South.  As of his retirement, Lathrop was ranked  No. 7 all-time in high school career coaching victories in the United States.

Lathrop's teams won Missouri State Titles in:

1970 - Squad went 27-1 led by Randy Culberson 6'2"
1972 - Led By John Harrison 6'5" and Ed Stoll 6'6"
1977 - led by the F-Troop, better known as Bill Fennelly, Kevin Fromm and Larry Frevert.
1990 - Went 31-0 and were led by Jevon Crudup.

He also went to the Final Four six other times in 1974, 1975, 1985, 1992, 1993, 2003.

He advanced to the state playoffs 23 times, and won 35 conference championships. Lathrop is a member of the Missouri Sports Hall of Fame.

254 of Lathrop's former players went on to play college basketball at various levels.

Boys golf
The Raytown South boys golf team have qualified for the Missouri State Championship as a team eight times(1964, 1965, 1970, 1976, 1980, 1982, 1985, 2002).

In 1976, Doug Maddox won the individual state championship with a 136 total score (68-66) at Grandview G.C. in Springfield, MO.

Notable alumni
Jason Belser - Played football at the University of Oklahoma and had a long career with the Indianapolis Colts and Kansas City Chiefs. Class of 1988.
Kara Brock - Television and film actress.
Mara Brock Akil - Writer and television producer
John D. Carmack - Co-founder of id Software
Jabril Cox - NFL player
Jevon Crudup - Played basketball at the University of Missouri and was drafted 48th overall by the Detroit Pistons in the 1994 NBA Draft
Maurice Mitchell - Ran track at Florida State University and was a qualifier for the 2012 Summer Olympics in the 200 meters, Class of 2008
Limbo Parks - former NFL player
Stan Wall - former baseball player for Los Angeles Dodgers
Ish Wainright - NBA player for the Phoenix Suns

Notable former staff
Jevon Crudup - former coach, played basketball at the University of Missouri and was drafted 48th overall by the Detroit Pistons in the 1994 NBA Draft

References

External links
Raytown South H.S.

Schools in Jackson County, Missouri
High schools in Jackson County, Missouri
Public high schools in Missouri
1961 establishments in Missouri